The R572 road is a regional road in Ireland. It is a road on the Beara Peninsula in County Cork. The road forms part of the Wild Atlantic Way. Parts of the road are on the Beara Way walking trail.

The R572 travels west from the N71 to Adrigole along Bantry Bay. The Caha Mountains, and in particular Sugarloaf Mountain, are on the landward side of the road. The road continues to Castletown Bearhaven, a fishing port and former British naval base. The road ends at Crow Head on Dursey Sound, where Ireland's only cable car connects the mainland to Dursey Island.

References

Regional roads in the Republic of Ireland
Roads in County Cork